Sakvithi Dadayama is a 2012 Sri Lankan Sinhala comedy thriller film directed by Sumith Galhena and produced by N.C. Vithanage. It stars Vijaya Nandasiri and Arjuna Kamalanath in lead roles along with Anusha Damayanthi and Rex Kodippili. Music composed by Farhan Shah. Amila Nadeeshani and Nuwan Gunawardena involved as singers. It is the 1168th Sri Lankan film in the Sinhala cinema.

Plot

Cast
 Vijaya Nandasiri as Maximus aka Mixi
 Arjuna Kamalanath as Jackson aka Jackie
 Anusha Damayanthi as Senuri
 Rex Kodippili as Cyril
 Maureen Charuni
 Susila Kottage
 Keerthi Ranjith Peiris
 Nandana Hettiarachchi as Piyadasa aka Piyaa

References

2012 films
2010s Sinhala-language films